The John A. Volpe National Transportation Systems Center or simply Volpe in Cambridge, Massachusetts, is a center of transportation and logistics expertise, operating under the United States Department of Transportation (U.S. DOT).

The Volpe Center is named after Governor of Massachusetts and U.S. Secretary of Transportation John Volpe, and its work includes a broad mix of projects that cut across traditional transportation modes and technical disciplines including the Federal Aviation Administration's Enhanced Traffic Management System (ETMS) and Safety Performance Analysis System (SPAS), and the Federal Motor Carrier Safety Administration's SafeStat Online.

The Center assists federal, state, and local governments, industry, and academia in a number of areas of consultation including human factors research, system design, implementation and assessment, global tracking, strategic investment and resource allocation, environmental preservation, and organizational effectiveness.

Volpe is part of the U.S. DOT's Research and Innovative Technology Administration. However, it differs from most federal organizations in that it receives no direct appropriation from Congress. Instead, it is funded 100% through a fee-for-service structure in which all costs are covered by sponsored project work (approx. $200 million annually).

Location 
Volpe is located on the campus of NASA's former Electronics Research Center in Cambridge, Massachusetts, across the Charles River from Boston, across the street from the Massachusetts Institute of Technology (MIT), and next to the Kendall/MIT MBTA Red Line subway stop.

Redevelopment 
In January 2017, MIT signed an agreement with the U.S. General Services Administration (GSA) to redevelop the John A. Volpe National Transportation Systems Center, with the state aim of turning the 14-acre parcel into a more vibrant mixed-use site.

In October 2017, the Cambridge City Council approved MIT’s rezoning petition for the site and a team of architects and landscape planners have been working to imagine a new home for the Volpe Center.

See also
Aircraft Situation Display to Industry

References

External links
 

United States Department of Transportation
United States Department of Transportation agencies
Organizations based in Cambridge, Massachusetts